Migration is the second album by Los Angeles, California-based R&B group Creative Source. This was their last album on Sussex Records before moving onto Polydor Records in 1975.

Track listing

"I'm Gonna Get There" - (Michael Stokes, Joe Thomas, Don Wyatt)  2:27 	
"Harlem" - (Bill Withers)  4:57 
"I Just Can't See Myself Without You"- (Skip Scarborough)  7:30
"Keep On Movin'" - (Michael Stokes, Joe Thomas, Skip Scarborough)  2:35
"Migration"  - (Michael Stokes, Joe Thomas)  4:22 
"Corazon" - (Carole King)  4:41
"Let Me Be the One" - (Paul Williams, Roger Nichols)  3:27

Personnel
Clarence McDonald, Michael Stokes, Skip Scarborough - Keyboards
Melvin "Wah-Wah Watson" Ragin, Ray Parker Jr.  - Guitar	
Kenneth "Spider" Rice - Drums
Ralph Terrana - Synthesizer
John Tradel - Horns
Carl Austin - Strings

Charts

References

External links
 Creative Source-Migration at Discogs

1974 albums
Creative Source albums
Sussex Records albums